Stephen Ross Harris (May 22, 1824 – January 15, 1905) was an American lawyer and politician who served one term as a U.S. Representative from Ohio from 1895 to 1897. He was an uncle of Ebenezer Byron Finley.

Biography 
Born seven miles west of Massillon, Ohio, Harris attended the common and select schools, Washington College (Pennsylvania), Norwalk (Ohio) Seminary, and Western Reserve College, then at Hudson, Ohio.
He studied law.
He was admitted to the bar in 1849 and commenced practice in Columbus, Ohio.
He moved to Bucyrus, Ohio, the same year and continued the practice of law. He became law partner of Josiah Scott from 1850 to Scott's death in 1879, except that time Scott was on the Ohio Supreme Court.
He served as mayor of Bucyrus 1852, 1853, 1861, and 1862.
Deputy United States marshal in 1861.
He served as president of the Ohio State Bar Association in 1893 and 1894.

Harris was elected as a Republican to the Fifty-fourth Congress (March 4, 1895 - March 4, 1897).
He was an unsuccessful candidate for reelection in 1896 to the Fifty-fifth Congress.
He engaged in the practice of law in Bucyrus, Ohio, until his death there January 15, 1905.
He was interred in Oakwood Cemetery.
Harris was married September 15, 1853 to Mary Jane Monnett, who died in 1888, with two sons and two daughters surviving her.

Sources

1824 births
1905 deaths
People from Massillon, Ohio
People from Bucyrus, Ohio
Mayors of places in Ohio
Ohio lawyers
Case Western Reserve University alumni
Washington & Jefferson College alumni
United States Marshals
19th-century American politicians
Republican Party members of the United States House of Representatives from Ohio